The discography of American alternative rock band Soul Asylum consists of 12 studio albums, two live albums, five compilation albums, two extended plays (EPs), 22 singles, and 17 music videos. Formed in 1981 in Minneapolis, Minnesota using the name Loud Fast Rules, the band's original lineup consisted of vocalist Dave Pirner, guitarist Dan Murphy, bassist Karl Mueller, and drummer Pat Morley. The band changed their name to Soul Asylum prior to the release of Say What You Will... Everything Can Happen in 1984. Later that year, Morley was replaced on drums by Grant Young.

The band released two studio albums for Twin/Tone Records in 1986, Made to Be Broken and While You Were Out, as well as the cassette-only Time's Incinerator, a collection of B-sides, outtakes, and demos. Having a loyal and growing fan base, along with positive reviews from alternative rock critics, Soul Asylum signed with A&M Records in 1988. They recorded the Clam Dip & Other Delights EP for European release, followed by the full-length Hang Time in 1988. Produced by Lenny Kaye and Ed Stasium, Hang Time was well-received on college radio but the follow-up album, And the Horse They Rode in On (1990), was a critical and commercial disappointment, resulting in the band being dropped by A&M.

Soul Asylum signed with Columbia Records and released Grave Dancers Union in 1992. The album's first single, "Somebody to Shove", went to number one on the Modern Rock chart, and "Black Gold" also received significant airplay on radio and MTV. "Runaway Train" crossed over to the pop charts, peaking at number five on the Billboard Hot 100 in 1993 and winning the Grammy Award for Best Rock Song. The song's music video, directed by Tony Kaye, features photos of missing children and was adapted for several international markets. "Runaway Train" peaked at number one in Canada and reached the top 10 in the Netherlands, Germany, New Zealand, Sweden, Switzerland, and the United Kingdom. The song's success helped Grave Dancers Union achieve double-platinum certification by Music Canada and by the Recording Industry Association of America (RIAA) in the United States.

The band's seventh album, Let Your Dim Light Shine (1995), peaked at number six in the US and in Canada. It was certified double-platinum in Canada and platinum in the US. Lead single "Misery" charted at number three in Canada and was a top 30 hit in the US, Australia, New Zealand, and the UK. In September 1995, Soul Asylum performed at a concert commemorating the Rock and Roll Hall of Fame opening in Cleveland, Ohio. A two-disc compilation of the event released the following year features the band's performances of "Back Door Man" with Iggy Pop and "Sweet Jane" with Lou Reed. Soul Asylum's next studio album, Candy from a Stranger (1998), charted in the US and Canada but it sold fewer copies and received less favorable reviews than its predecessors. After taking a break, the band began recording a new album in 2004. However, sessions were put on hold when bassist Karl Mueller was diagnosed with throat cancer; he died the following year. Guest musicians—including bassist Tommy Stinson, who later joined the group as a permanent member—were brought in to complete the album The Silver Lining (2006). The band's next album, Delayed Reaction (2012), received positive reviews and it entered the US album charts, but founding member Dan Murphy left the group at the end of the year. Soul Asylum released their eleventh album, Change of Fortune, in 2016 and their twelfth album, Hurry Up and Wait, in 2020.

Albums

Studio albums

Live albums

Compilation albums

Extended plays

Singles

Other appearances

Music videos

References

External links
 Official website
 Soul Asylum at AllMusic
 
 

Discographies of American artists
Alternative rock discographies